This is a timeline of the history of the BBC Television Service, from events preceding its launch in 1936 until its renaming as BBC One in 1964 upon the launch of BBC Two.

1920s
1929
November – The BBC and John Logie Baird begin daily experimental broadcasting of 30-line television transmissions using the BBC's 2LO transmitter.

1930s
1930
14 July – First television drama broadcast, a production of Luigi Pirandello's The Man With the Flower in His Mouth by the BBC from Baird's studios at 133 Long Acre, London, directed by Val Gielgud.
1931
No events.
1932
2 August – The BBC starts a regular television service, using John Logie Baird's 30-line system.
1933
21 April – The first television revue, Looking In, is shown on the BBC. The first four minutes of this programme survive on a Silvatone record, an early method of home video recording.
September – BBC Television Policy, Rumours and Facts is published.
1934
8 January – Radio Times lists this date as the first on which a television programme is broadcast by the BBC. The 30-minute programme, titled Television: By the Baird Process, airs at 11:00pm.
31 March – The agreement for joint experimental transmissions by the BBC and John Logie Baird's company comes to an end.
1935
11 September – Final transmission of John Logie Baird’s 30-line television system by the BBC. The BBC begins preparations for a regular high definition broadcasting service from Alexandra Palace.
1936
2 November – The first regular high-definition (then defined as at least 200 lines) BBC Television Service, based at Alexandra Palace in London, officially begins broadcasting (after test transmissions began in August). The service alternates on a weekly basis between Baird's 240-line mechanical system and the Marconi-EMI's 405-line all-electronic system. Programmes are broadcast daily, Monday to Saturday, at 15:00–16:00 and 21:00–22:00.
1937
6 February – The BBC Television Service drops the Baird system in favour of the Marconi-EMI 405 lines system.
 24 April – The very first children's television show For the Children is broadcast.
12 May – The BBC use their outside broadcast unit for the first time, to televise the coronation of King George VI and Queen Elizabeth. A fragment of this broadcast is one of the earliest surviving examples of British television – filmed off-screen at home by an engineer with an 8 mm cine camera. A short section of this footage was used in a programme during the week of the 1953 coronation of Queen Elizabeth II, and this latter programme survives in the BBC's archives.
14 May – The BBC Television Service broadcasts a thirty-minute excerpt of Twelfth Night, the first known instance of a Shakespeare play on television. Among the cast is Greer Garson. Peggy Ashcroft appeared in a 1939 telecast of the entire play.
18 June – Broadcast of the Agatha Christie play Wasp's Nest, the only instance of Christie adapting one of her works for television, a medium she later came to dislike.
21 June – Wimbledon Championships (tennis) first shown on the BBC Television Service.
16 September – Football is televised for the first time. It is a specially-arranged friendly match between Arsenal and Arsenal Reserves at Highbury.
11 November – The BBC Television Service broadcasts an adaptation of the Great War-set play Journey's End by R. C. Sherriff, starring Reginald Tate as Stanhope. Shown in commemoration of Armistice Day, it is the first time that a whole evening's programming has been given over to a single play.
1938
21 February – The BBC Television Service broadcasts the first ever piece of television science-fiction, a 35-minute adaptation of a segment of the play R.U.R. by the Czech playwright Karel Čapek.
12 March – First news bulletin carried by the BBC Television Service, in sound only. Previously, the service had aired British Movietone News cinema newsreels.
1 April – The Oxford and Cambridge Boat Race is first televised on the BBC Television Service.
19 April – The first televised football (soccer) match, England v Scotland, shown on the BBC Television Service.
30 April – The FA Cup Final is televised for the first time on the BBC Television Service.
14 May – The first quiz show, Spelling Bee, is televised on the BBC Television Service.
24 June – Test match Cricket is broadcast for the first time on the BBC Television Service, with coverage of the second test of The Ashes series between England and Australia, live from Lord's Cricket Ground.
1939
4 March – The BBC Television Service broadcasts one of the first plays to be written especially for television, Condemned To Be Shot by R. E. J. Brooke. The production is notable for the use of a camera as the first-person perspective of the play's unseen central character.
27 March – The BBC Television Service broadcasts the entirety of Magyar Melody live from His Majesty's Theatre. The 175-minute broadcast is the first showing of a full-length musical on television.
1 September – The anticipated outbreak of war brings television broadcasting at the BBC Television Service to an end at 12:35pm, after the broadcast of a Mickey Mouse cartoon, Mickey's Gala Premiere and various sound and vision test signals. It is feared that the VHF waves of television would act as a perfect homing signal for guiding enemy bombers to central London: in any case, the engineers of the television service would be needed for the war effort, particularly for radar. The BBC Television Service would resume its broadcasting, with the same Mickey Mouse cartoon, after the war in 1946.
unknown date – The Shaw play The Man of Destiny was shown on BBC Television.

1940s
1940 to 1945
No events due to the service being closed for the duration of World War II.
1946
7 June – The BBC Television Service begins broadcasting again. The first words heard are "Good afternoon everybody. How are you? Do you remember me, Jasmine Bligh?". The Mickey Mouse cartoon Mickey's Gala Premiere that had been the last programme transmitted seven years earlier at the start of World War II, is reshown after Bligh's introduction.
June – BBC Wimbledon, the longest pre-war programme since it debuted in 1927 returns, which brings back the longest tennis tournament after the end of World War II and the reintroduction of the BBC Television Service.
7 July – The BBC's children's programme For the Children returns, one of the few pre-war programmes to resume after the reintroduction of the BBC Television Service.
4 August – Children's puppet "Muffin the Mule" debuts in an episode of For the Children. He is so popular he is given his own show later in the year on a new service Watch with Mother.
22 October – Telecrime, the first television crime series from the 1930s, returns for the final run on the BBC Television Service, retitled Telecrimes.
October – The first live televised football match is broadcast from Barnet's home ground Underhill. Twenty minutes of first half the game against Wealdstone were televised and thirty five minutes of the second half were shown before it became too dark to continue with the coverage.
29 November – Pinwright's Progress, British television's first sitcom, debuts on the BBC Television Service.
1947
10 February – 11 March – The BBC Television Service is temporarily suspended for the first time since World War II due to a national fuel crisis.
9 November – Memorial service broadcast from the Cenotaph on the BBC Television Service, using tele-recording for the first time.
20 November – The Princess Elizabeth (later Elizabeth II), daughter of George VI marries The Duke of Edinburgh at Westminster Abbey, London. The service is watched by an estimated 400,000 viewers and is the oldest surviving telerecorded programme in Britain.
Adelaide Hall appearing in Variety in Sepia, the first telecording by BBC (kinescope) showing black singer Adelaide Hall performing two songs with chorus and her guitar. Copies of this first English kinescope of live TV broadcast are preserved by the BBC.
Café Continental premieres on the BBC Television Service.
1948
5 January – Television Newsreel is first shown on the BBC Television Service.
29 July – The BBC Television Service begins its coverage of the Olympic Games in London by broadcasting the opening ceremony. From now until the closing ceremony on 14 August the BBC Television Service will broadcast an average three and a half hours a day of live coverage from the Games, using a special coaxial cable linking the main venue at Wembley Stadium to the television service's base at Alexandra Palace. This is the most ambitious sustained outside broadcast yet attempted by the BBC, but passes off with no serious problems.
1949
July – BBC Television revives the regular televised weather forecast.
29 September – The BBC Television Service first broadcasts Come Dancing, a TV ballroom dancing competition show.
26 October – How Do You View?, the first comedy series on British television, starring Terry-Thomas, is first broadcast.
17 December – The Sutton Coldfield television transmitter is opened in the Midlands, making it the first part of the UK outside London to receive the BBC Television Service.

1950s
1950
23 February – First televised report of the general election results in the UK.
3 April – The BBC aspect ratio changes from 5:4 to 4:3.
21 May – The BBC's Lime Grove television studios open.
11 July – Andy Pandy premieres on the BBC Television Service.
27 August – The first ever live television pictures from across the English Channel are transmitted by the BBC Television Service. The two-hour programme is broadcast live from Calais in northern France to mark the centenary of the first message sent by submarine telegraph cable from England to France.
30 September – First BBC Television Service broadcast from an aircraft.
1951
16 July – What's My Line? debuts on the BBC Television Service. It will be one of the top-rated programmes for the rest of the decade and make a star of its host, Eamonn Andrews, who takes over from Gilbert Harding from the second episode.
12 October – The Holme Moss transmitter is opened in Northern England, making the BBC Television Service available to the region for the first time.
1952
16 January – Sooty, Harry Corbett's glove puppet bear, first appears on the BBC Television Service.
15 February – The funeral of King George VI is televised in the UK.
14 March – The BBC Television Service is launched in Scotland.
20 July – Arrow to the Heart, the first collaboration between director Rudolph Cartier and scriptwriter Nigel Kneale, is broadcast on the BBC Television Service.
15 December – Bill and Ben, The Flower Pot Men premieres on the BBC Television Service.
1953
17 March – Patrick Troughton becomes television's first Robin Hood, playing the eponymous folk hero in the first of six half-hour episodes of Robin Hood, shown weekly until 21 April on the BBC Television Service.
1 May – The BBC brings into service television transmitters at Pontop Pike (County Durham) and Glencairn (Belfast) to improve coverage prior to the Coronation broadcast.
2 June – The Coronation of Queen Elizabeth II is televised in the UK on the BBC Television Service. Sales of TV sets rise sharply in the weeks leading up to the event. It is also one of the earliest broadcasts to be deliberately recorded for posterity and still exists in its entirety today.
18 July – The Quatermass Experiment, first of the famous Quatermass science-fiction serials by Nigel Kneale, begins its run on the BBC Television Service.
20 July – The Good Old Days begins on the BBC Television Service.
11 November – The current affairs series Panorama launches on the BBC Television Service. It is now the longest-running programme in British television history.
2 December – The BBC broadcasts its 'Television Symbol' for the first time, the first animated television presentation symbol in the world. Known as the 'bat's wings' by logo enthusiasts, it would remain until 1960.
Peter Scott presents the first BBC television natural history broadcast, from his home at Slimbridge.
1954
11 January – The first weather forecast with an in-vision presenter is televised in the UK. The first weather presenter was George Cowling.
9 April – The Grove Family, generally considered the first British TV soap opera, debuts on the BBC Television Service.
5 July – First actual news bulletin, News and Newsreel, aired on the BBC Television Service, replacing Television Newsreel.
12 December – The BBC Television Service screens its famous, and controversial, adaptation of George Orwell's Nineteen Eighty-Four.
30 December – The first BBC Sports Personality of the Year ceremony is presented from London's Savoy Hotel. It has aired annually ever since.
1955
2 January – Annette Mills who hosted Muffin the Mule makes her last appearance on television.
10 January – Annette Mills dies from a heart attack after an operation. Following her death, Muffin the Mule is dropped by the BBC Television Service.
15 January 
The Benny Hill Show premieres on the BBC Television Service, later moving to ITV. Its global audience figures will be counted in the billions.
The BBC broadcasts Heinz Sielmann's pioneering nature documentary Zimmerleute des Waldes as Woodpecker at the behest of David Attenborough and presented by Peter Scott; it is repeated several times during the year.
17 May – Sir Anthony Eden hosts a ground-breaking television election programme for the Conservative Party, the first broadcast of its type. The 30-minute programme features government ministers pitted against newspaper editors.
29 June – Life with the Lyons, one of the first successful British sitcoms (though starring the American, Ben Lyon), premieres on the BBC Television Service, having previously been broadcast only on radio.
9 July – Dixon of Dock Green premieres on the BBC Television Service.
21 July – The BBC brings into service its Divis transmitting station, its first permanent 405-line VHF Band I facility serving Northern Ireland, marking the launch of a television service for Northern Ireland; the 35 kW transmissions can also be readily received in much of the Republic of Ireland.
29 July – This Is Your Life premieres on the BBC Television Service.
4 September – Newsreaders appear "in vision" for the first time.
22 October – Quatermass II sequel to 1953's The Quatermass Experiment, premieres on the BBC Television Service. It ends on 26 November.
25 December – After being on radio since 1932, the Royal Christmas Message is broadcast on British television for the first time, in sound only at 3pm. The first visual Christmas message is shown in 1957.
1956
6 July – Hancock's Half Hour debuts on the BBC Television Service.
1957
16 February – The "Toddlers' Truce" (an arrangement whereby there were no television broadcasts between 6 pm and 7 pm, to allow parents to put their children to bed!) is abolished.
21 April – Historical documentary series Men, Women and Clothes begins airing. It is the first BBC programme filmed in colour, although it can only be transmitted in black and white.
24 April – The Sky at Night appears for the first time, presented by Patrick Moore. It continues to air with Moore as presenter until his death in December 2012.
3 December – Face to Face debuts on the BBC Television Service.
25 December – The Royal Christmas Message is first televised with a message from Elizabeth II.
1958
14 April — The newly magnetic videotape machine Vision Electronic Recording Apparatus or VERA for short, is given a live demonstration on air in Panorama where Richard Dimbleby seated by a clock, talks for a couple of minutes about the new method of vision recording with an instant playback. The tape is then wound back and replayed. The picture is slightly watery, but reasonably watchable, and instant playback is something completely new.
16 October – Blue Peter, the world's longest-running children's TV programme, debuts on the BBC Television Service. It continues to air to the present day.
28 October – The State Opening of Parliament is broadcast on television for the first time.
1959
1 January – The first broadcast of the Vienna New Year's Concert from Austria airs on BBC Television.
1 June – Juke Box Jury premieres on the BBC Television Service.

1960s
1960
26 March – The Grand National is televised for the first time, by the BBC Television Service.
20 June – Nan Winton becomes the first national female newsreader on the BBC Television Service.
29 June – The BBC Television Centre is opened in London.
13 July – The Pilkington Committee on Broadcasting is established to consider the future of broadcasting. Their report, published in 1962, criticises the populism of ITV, and recommends that Britain's third national television channel (after the BBC Television Service and ITV) should be awarded to the BBC.
19 September – BBC Schools starts using the Pie Chart ident.
8 October – The BBC Television Service is renamed as BBC TV.
1961
1 October – Songs of Praise, featuring Christian congregations singing hymns, debuts on BBC Television, the first programme being hosted by Tabernacle Chapel, Cardiff. The series will still be on the air 60 years later.
2 October – Points of View, featuring the letters of viewers offering praise, criticism and comments on the television of recent weeks, debuts on BBC Television. The series will still be on the air 60 years later.
15 December – The BBC broadcasts the first Comedy Playhouse. The series broadcasts a series of one-off unrelated sitcoms. Over the next 14 years the series would air the pilot episodes of many popular comedies, including  Steptoe and Son, Till Death Us Do Part, Up Pompeii!, The Liver Birds, Are You Being Served? and Last of the Summer Wine, the latter of which would run until 2010. 
1962
2 January – Z-Cars premieres on BBC TV, noted as a realistic portrayal of the police.
17 April – Brothers in Law premieres on BBC TV.
14 June – BBC television broadcasts the first episode of the sitcom Steptoe and Son, written by Galton and Simpson.
24 November – The first episode of influential satire show That Was The Week That Was is broadcast on BBC Television.
1963
13 January – BBC TV broadcasts the play The Madhouse on Castle Street in the Sunday-Night Theatre strand. The play co-stars a young American folk music singer named Bob Dylan.
30 September – BBC TV begins using a globe as their symbol. They would continue to use it in varying forms until 2002.
22 November – BBC TV interrupts regular programming to report the assassination of John F. Kennedy.
23 November 
That Was The Week That Was broadcasts its famous, non-satirical Kennedy tribute episode on BBC TV.
Doctor Who premieres on BBC TV with the first episode of the four-part serial An Unearthly Child. The First Doctor is portrayed by William Hartnell.
28 December – The satirical BBC show That Was The Week That Was (TW3) airs for the last time.
1964
1 January – The first Top of the Pops airs on BBC TV.
4 January – Test transmissions begin for BBC2.
9 February – Launch of BBC Wales TV.
20 April – BBC2 starts broadcasting; the existing BBC TV channel is renamed BBC1.

See also
 Timeline of BBC One
 Timeline of BBC Two
 Timeline of non-flagship BBC television channels
Timeline of RTÉ Television

References

Television in the United Kingdom by year
BBC television timelines